Varehuset Messen was a department store on Købmagergade in Copenhagen, Denmark, operated by Hilligsøe, Køedt & Co..

History
 
The building was completed in 1895 to designs by Emil Blichfeldt.

Architecture
The five-storey building consists of nine bays on Købmagergade and 10 bays on Klareboderne. The building is topped by a Hermes statue by Julius Schultz.

Today
It is now used by Niels Brock Copenhagen Business College whose main building is on Kultorvet.

References

Retail buildings in Copenhagen
Buildings and structures completed in 1895